Siphonops hardyi, or Hardy's caecilian, is a species of caecilian in the family Siphonopidae. It is endemic to southeastern Brazil where it occurs in the states of São Paulo, Rio de Janeiro, Espírito Santo, and Minas Gerais, possibly wider. This species lives in soil and under leaf litter or stones in primary forest, plantations, and rural gardens. It is a common species; it can locally suffer from infrastructure development but is not generally threatened.

References

hardyi
Endemic fauna of Brazil
Amphibians of Brazil
Amphibians described in 1888
Taxonomy articles created by Polbot